

Overview 
The Battle of Old Town was a U.S. Civil War battle fought on August 2, 1864 as part of the Valley Campaign of 1864. Union forces amassed and took high ground at  Old Town, Maryland on the Potomac River in an ultimately unsuccessful attempt to trap Brigadier John McCausland’s Confederate States Army raiders behind Union lines. McCausland's forces had previously sacked and burned Chambersburg, Pennsylvania, on orders of Lieutenant General Jubal A. Early. The survival of McCausland and his section of the Army of Northern Virginia is credited to a single artillery shot directed at close range by Maryland Line Lieutenant John R. McNulty from his Baltimore Light Artillery command, which was supporting Brigadier Bradley Tyler Johnson’s 1st Maryland Infantry. Lieutenant (later Major) McNulty’s shot has been called “one of the most brilliant achievements of the war.”

See also

 Valley Campaigns of 1864

 U.S. Civil War

External links
  “(Gen.) Johnson’s Baltimore Light Artillery was deadly that day, disabling the locomotive with its first shot and dismounting one gun with a shot through a porthole with its second. A third shot scattered the Union Infantry behind the railroad embankment and the Potomac Home Guard was forced to take shelter in the woods, leaving Stough in the blockhouse without support. After an hour-and-a-half standoff, Johnson sent a message under a flag of truce demanding a surrender. Stough asked for and received generous terms and surrendered, his command immediately paroled with all personal equipment except weapons.”

References

Valley campaigns of 1864